Monte Melkonian (November 25, 1957 – June 12, 1993) was an Armenian-American revolutionary and left-wing nationalist militant. He was a commander in the Armenian army in Nagorno-Karabakh fighting Azerbaijan during the First Nagorno-Karabakh War in the early 1990s.

Melkonian left the United States and arrived in Iran in 1978 during the beginning of the 1979 Revolution, taking part in demonstrations against the Shah. Following the collapse of the Shah's monarchy, he traveled to Lebanon during the height of the civil war and served in an Armenian militia group in the Beirut suburb of Bourj Hammoud. He was one of the planners of the 1981 Turkish consulate attack in Paris. He was later arrested and sent to prison in France. In 1989, he was released and in the following year, acquired a visa to travel to Armenia.

Melkonian had no prior service record in any country's army before being placed in command of an estimated 4,000 men in the First Nagorno-Karabakh War. He had largely built his military experience beginning from the late 1970s and 1980s, when he fought in Lebanon with ASALA. Melkonian fought against various factions in the Lebanese Civil War and against the IDF in the 1982 war.

Monte Melkonian carried several aliases over his career and was known as Avo to the troops under his command in Nagorno-Karabakh; other aliases of his include 'Abu Sindi', 'Timothy Sean McCormack', and 'Saro.' The last years of his life were spent fighting with the Nagorno-Karabakh Defense Army. Monte was killed by Azerbaijani soldiers while surveying the village of Merzili with five of his comrades in the aftermath of battle. He was buried at Yerablur cemetery in Yerevan and was declared a National Hero of Armenia in 1996.

Early life

Youth
Melkonian was born on November 25, 1957, at Visalia Municipal Hospital in Visalia, California, to Charles (1918−2006) and Zabel Melkonian (1920−2012). He was the third of four children born to a self-employed cabinetmaker and an elementary-school teacher. By all accounts, Melkonian was described as an all-American child who joined the Boy Scouts and was a pitcher in Little League baseball. He also played the clarinet. Melkonian's parents rarely talked about their Armenian heritage with their children, often referring to the place of their ancestors as the "Old Country." His interest in his background only sparked at the age of eleven, when his family went on a year-long trip to Europe in 1969.

While taking Spanish language courses in Spain, his teacher had posed him the question of where he was from. Dissatisfied with Melkonian's answer of "California", the teacher rephrased the question by asking "where did your ancestors come from?" His brother Markar Melkonian remarked that "her image of us was not at all like our image of ourselves. She did not view us as the Americans we had always assumed we were." From this moment on, for days and months to come, Markar continues, "Monte pondered [their teacher Señorita] Blanca's question Where are you from?"

In the spring of that year, the family also traveled across Turkey to visit the town of Merzifon, where Melkonian's maternal grandparents were from. Merzifon's population at the time was 23,475 but was almost completely devoid of its once 17,000-strong Armenian population that was wiped out during the Armenian genocide in 1915. They did find one Armenian family of the three that was living in the town, however, Melkonian soon learned that the only reason this was so, was because the head of the family in 1915 had exchanged the safety of his family in return for identifying all the Armenians in the town to Turkish authorities during the genocide. Monte would later confide to his wife that "he was never the same after that visit....He saw the place that had been lost."

Education
Upon his return to California Monte returned to his education. In high school, he was exceeding all standards and having a hard time finding new academic challenges. Instead of graduating high school early, as was suggested by his principal, Monte found an alternative thanks to his father: a study abroad program in East Asia. At the age of 15 Monte traveled to Japan for a new chapter in his young life, namely to study martial arts and the Japanese language. While there, he began teaching English, which helped finance his travels through several Southeast Asian countries. This introduced him to several new cultures, new philosophies, new languages, and in several cases, like his travels through Vietnam (shortly before the Fall of Saigon), new skills that would become immensely valuable in his later life as a soldier. Returning to the United States, he graduated from high school and entered the University of California, Berkeley with Regents Scholarship, majoring in ancient Asian history and Archeology. In 1978 he helped to organize an exhibition of Armenian cultural artifacts at one of the university's libraries. The section of the exhibit dealing with the Armenian genocide was removed by university authorities at the request of the Turkish consul general in San Francisco. The display that was removed was eventually reinstalled following a campus protest movement. Monte eventually completed his undergraduate work in under three years. Upon graduating, he was accepted into the archeology graduate program at the University of Oxford. However, Monte chose to forgo this opportunity, and instead chose to begin his lifelong struggle for the Armenian Cause.

Departure from home

Teaching in Iran
After graduating from U.C. Berkeley in the spring of 1978, Monte traveled to Iran, where he taught English and participated in the movement to overthrow the Shah. He helped organize a teachers' strike at his school in Tehran, and was in the vicinity of Jaleh Square when the Shah's troops opened fire on protesters, killing and injuring many. Later, he found his way to Iranian Kurdistan, where Kurdish partisans made a deep impression on him. Years later, in southern Lebanon, he occasionally wore the uniform of the Kurdish peshmerga which he was given in Iranian Kurdistan.

Civil war in Lebanon
In the fall of 1978, Monte made his way to Beirut, the capital of Lebanon, in time to participate in the defense of the Armenian quarter against the right-wing Phalange forces. While he was living in East Beirut, Monte worked underground with individual members of the Social Democrat Hunchakian Party and the Lebanese Communist Party. Although he never professed an allegiance to the Armenian Revolutionary Federation (ARF), he was a member of the Armenian militia that defended positions in and around Bourj Hammoud that were under the command of ARF "group leaders". Monte was a permanent member of the militia's bases in Bourj Hammoud, Western Beirut, Antelias, Eastern Beirut and other regions for almost two years, during which time he participated in several street battles against rightist forces. He also began working behind the lines in Phalangist controlled territory, on behalf of the "Leftist and Arab" Lebanese National Movement. By this time, he was speaking Armenian – a language he had not learned until adulthood (Armenian was the fourth or fifth language Monte learned to speak fluently, after Spanish, French and Japanese. In addition, he spoke passable Arabic, Italian and Turkish, as well as some Persian and Kurdish).

ASALA
In the spring of 1980, Monte was inducted into the Armenian Secret Army for the Liberation of Armenia (ASALA) and secretly relocated to West Beirut. For the next three years he was an ASALA militant and contributor to the group's journal, Hayastan. During this time several Palestinian militant organizations provided their Armenian comrade with extensive military training. On 31 July 1980 in Athens, Melkonian assassinated the Administrative Attaché of Turkish Embassy in Greece, Galip Ozmen, considered by Melkonian to be a legitimate target for representing a regime that committed the Armenian genocide, occupied northern Cyprus, massacred Kurds in Turkey, among other crimes. After his death, Özmen was also revealed to have been a Turkish intelligence (MIT) spy. Melkonian also shot the passengers in the front and back seats who were obscured by darkly tinted window glass, believing them to be other diplomats. The passengers were later revealed to be Ozmen's wife Sevil and his sixteen-year-old son Kaan, who were wounded but survived, and his fourteen-year-old daughter Neslihan, who later died of her wounds. Melkonian was reportedly unhappy to find out who the other passengers were, and later wrote that he would've spared them if he had a clearer view.

Monte carried out armed operations in Rome, Athens and elsewhere, and he helped to plan and train commandos for the "Van Operation" of September 24, 1981, in which four ASALA militants took over the Turkish embassy in Paris and held it for several days. In November 1981, French police arrested and imprisoned a young, suspected criminal carrying a Cypriot passport bearing the name "Dimitri Georgiu." Following the detonation of several bombs in Paris aimed at gaining his release, "Georgiu" was returned to Lebanon where he revealed his identity as Monte Melkonian.

"French authorities arrested an individual at Orly Airport whose documents identified him as 'Dimitriu Giorgiu.' Subsequent investigation revealed that he was Monte Melkonian, a ranking member of ASALA, and suspected of the attempted assassination on 25 October 1981 of the Second Secretary of the Turkish Embassy in Rome, Gokberk Ergenekon. Mujahed [i.e. ASALA] ordered not only a bombing campaign, but specifically mass bombings of public places, in an obvious attempt to cause large numbers of injuries and deaths. The campaign, undertaken under the name of the "Orly Group," produced no deaths and few injuries, but did effect Melkonian's release. Because the tactic of the retributive bombing campaign had had some success, Mujahed continued to employ it in 1982." 

In mid-July 1983, ASALA violently split into two factions, one opposed to the group's despotic leader, whose nom de guerre was Hagop Hagopian, and another supporting him. Although the lines of fissure had been deepening over the course of several years, the shooting of Hagopian's two closest aides at a military camp in Lebanon finally led to the open breach. This impetuous action was perpetrated by one individual who was not closely affiliated with Monte. As a result of this action, however, Hagopian took revenge by personally torturing and executing two of Monte's dearest comrades, Garlen Ananian and Aram Vartanian.

Arrest and imprisonment
In the aftermath of this split, Monte spent over two years underground, first in Lebanon and later in France. After testifying secretly for the defense in the trial of Armenian militant and accused bank robber Levon Minassian, he was arrested in Paris in November 1985 and sentenced to six years in prison for possession of falsified papers and carrying an illegal handgun.

Monte spent over three years in Fresnes and Poissy prisons. He was released in early 1989 and sent from France to South Yemen, where he was reunited with his girlfriend Seda. Together they spent year and a half living underground in various countries of eastern Europe in relative poverty, as one Eastern Bloc regime after another disintegrated.

Armenia
On October 6, 1990, Monte arrived in what was then still Armenian Soviet Socialist Republic. During the first 8 months in Armenia, Melkonian worked in the Armenian Academy of Sciences, where he prepared an archaeological research monograph on Urartian cave tombs, which was posthumously published in 1995.

Finding himself on Armenian soil after many years, he wrote in a letter that he found a lot of confusion among his compatriots. Armenia faced enormous economic, political and environmental problems at every turn, problems that had festered for decades. New political forces bent on dismantling the Soviet Union were taking Armenia in a direction that Monte believed was bound to exacerbate the crisis and produce more problems. He believed that "a national blunder was taking place right before his eyes."

Under these circumstances, it quickly became clear to Monte that, for better or for worse, the Soviet Union had no future and the coming years would be perilous ones for the Armenian people. He then focused his energy on Nagorno-Karabakh. "If we lose [Karabakh]," the bulletin of the Nagorno-Karabakh Defense Forces quoted him as saying, "we turn the final page of our people's history." He believed that, if Azeri forces succeeded in deporting Armenians from Karabakh, they would advance on Zangezur and other regions of Armenia. This proved prescient given Azerbaijan's insistence of a "Zangezur corridor" following the 2020 ceasefire agreement and Azerbaijan's incursion into sovereign territory of the Republic of Armenia during the 2020-2021 border crisis. Thus, he saw the fate of Nagorno-Karabakh as crucial for the long-term security of the entire Armenian nation.

Nagorno-Karabakh

On September 12 (or 14) 1991 Monte travelled to the Shahumian region (north of Karabakh), where he fought for three months in the fall of 1991. There he participated in the capture of Erkej, Manashid and Buzlukh villages.

On February 4, 1992, Melkonian arrived in Martuni as the regional commander. Upon his arrival the changes were immediately felt: civilians started feeling more secure and at peace as Azeri armies were pushed back and were finding it increasingly difficult to shell Martuni's residential areas with GRAD missiles.

In April 1993, Melkonian was one of the chief military strategists who planned and led the operation to fight Azeri fighters and capture the region of Kalbajar of Azerbaijan which lies between Armenia and former NKAO. Armenian forces captured the region in four days of heavy fighting, sustaining far fewer fatalities than the enemy.

Death and legacy

Monte was killed in the abandoned village of Merzili in the early afternoon of June 12, 1993 during the Battle of Aghdam. According to Markar Melkonian, Monte's older brother and author of his biography, Monte died in the waning hours of the evening by enemy fire during an unexpected skirmish that broke out with several Azerbaijani soldiers who had likely gotten lost.

Monte was buried with full military honors on June 19, 1993, at Yerablur military cemetery in the outskirts of Yerevan, where his coffin was brought from the Surb Zoravar Church in the city center. Some 50,000 to 100,000 people (some reports put the figure as high as 250,000), including Armenian President Levon Ter-Petrosyan, acting Defense Minister Vazgen Manukyan, Deputy Foreign Minister Gerard Libaridian, government officials, and parliamentarians attended his funeral.

The Karabakh town of Martuni was renamed Monteaberd (or Monteapert; ; literally "Fort Monte") in his honor.

In 1993 the Monte Melkonian Military Academy was established in Yerevan.

In 2021 the village of Shahumyani Trchnafabrika was renamed Monteavan.

In November 2021 a statue of Melkonian was unveiled in Vardenis.

Public image
Monte had become a legend in Armenia and Karabakh by the time of his death. Due to his international socialist and Armenian nationalist views, one author described him as a mix between the early 20th century Armenian military commander Andranik and Marxist revolutionary Che Guevara. Thomas de Waal described him as a "professional warrior and an extreme Armenian nationalist" who is "the most celebrated Armenian commander" of the Nagorno-Karabakh War. Raymond Bonner wrote in 1993 that Monte had charisma and discipline, which is why he "rapidly became the most highly regarded commander in the Karabakh War." Historian Razmik Panossian wrote that Monte was "a charismatic and very capable commander."

Views and beliefs

Political views
Melkonian was an Armenian nationalist and a revolutionary socialist. Throughout his life he sympathized with Marxism–Leninism, which was also the ideology of ASALA. Vorbach wrote in 1994 that his writings "expose him as an Armenian nationalist and a committed socialist of the Marxist-Leninist variety." According to his brother he "had not always been a communist, but he had never been an ex-communist." Melkonian hoped that the Soviet Union would "reform itself, democratize, and promote personal freedoms" and did not abandon hope in Soviet Armenia until the end of the Soviet era appeared inevitable. Philip Marsden wrote that his career "reveals the profound shift in radical ideology—from revolutionary Marxism to nationalism." Marsden adds that in the 1980s his ideology came into conflict with a growing nationalism: "With ever greater difficulty, he squeezed the Armenian question into the context of left-wing orthodoxy, believing for instance that Armenia's independence from the Soviet Union would be a terrible error." In the 1980s he advocated for the Soviet takeover of Turkey's formerly Armenian populated areas and its unification with Soviet Armenia. Yet he likewise supported the idea that "the most direct way... to attain the right to live in 'Western Armenia' is by participating in the revolutionary struggle in Turkey" and considered the option of Armenian self-determination within a revolutionary Turkish or Kurdish state. In the 1980s, while in a French prison, he called for the creation of a guerilla force in eastern Turkey which would unite Kurdish rebels, left-wing Turks, and Armenian revolutionaries. Vorbach summarized his views on Turkey:

While in Poissy prison Monte drafted a political manifesto for his envisioned "Armenian Patriotic Liberation Movement," in which he outlines seven core principles: 1) revolutionary internationalism, 2) democracy and self-determination, 3) socialism, 4) feminism, 5) environmentalism, 6) anti-imperialism, and 7) peace and disarmament.

By the early 1990s he saw Karabakh as a "sacred cause". He is quoted as saying, "If we lose Karabakh, we turn the final page of our people's history."

Monte was also an internationalist. In an article titled "Imperialism in the New World Order" he declared his support for socialist movements in Palestine, South Africa, Central America and elsewhere. He also espoused environmentalism from an anti-capitalist perspective. According to one author his economic views were influenced by the Beirut-based Armenian Marxist economist Alexander Yenikomshian.

Maile Melkonian, Monte's sister, wrote in response to David Rieff's 1997 article in Foreign Affairs that Melkonian was never associated with and was not a supporter of the views of the Armenian Revolutionary Federation (Dashnaks).

Self-defeating behavior in daily life
Monte was said to have led an exemplary life by not smoking and drinking. Monte advocated that revolutionary socialists must lead "practical self-disciplined lives" and avoid "self-destructive habits" such as smoking or drinking alcohol: "By severely diminishing a person's self-discipline, these dependencies inhibit a person from becoming a member of the vanguard, and especially a guerrilla or fedaii." When he joined in toasts, he is said to have raised a glass of yogurt. Monte is widely known to have forbidden his soldiers consumption of alcohol. He also established a policy of collecting a tax in kind on Martuni wine, in the form of diesel and ammunition for his fighters. Monte also burned cultivated fields of cannabis in Karabakh.

Personal life
Monte Melkonian married his long-time girlfriend Seda Kebranian at the Geghard monastery in Armenia in August 1991. They had met in the late 1970s in Lebanon. In a 1993 interview Monte said that they had had no time to start a family. He stated, "We'll settle down when the Armenian people's struggle is over."

As of 2013 Seda, an activist and a lecturer, resided in Anchorage, Alaska with her husband Joel Condon who is a professor of architecture at the University of Alaska Anchorage.

Awards
sources:

References

Notes

Citations

Bibliography

Melkonian, Monte (1990). The Right to Struggle: Selected Writings of Monte Melkonian on the Armenian National Question. San Francisco: Sardarabad Collective

External links

The Monte Melkonian Fund is a non-profit charity established in 1995 and is dedicated in Melkonian's honor.
Gallery of Monte Melkonian on the Melkonian Fund Website include photos of his youth, years spent in Lebanon and Karabakh.
Monte Melkonian Video 
, including an interview with his wife 
2-part documentary video about Monte, including rare interviews, on Google Video: Part 1 and Part 2 

1957 births
1993 deaths
American emigrants to Armenia
American emigrants to Iran
American people of Armenian descent
Armenian colonels
Armenian communists
Armenian military personnel of the Nagorno-Karabakh War
Armenian nationalists
Armenian revolutionaries
Armenian socialists
Burials at Yerablur
National Hero of Armenia
People from Visalia, California
People of the Iranian Revolution
People of the Lebanese Civil War
University of California, Berkeley alumni
Armenian people imprisoned abroad
Prisoners and detainees of France